The  government's decision to diversify from an oil-based economy, and to make Dubai the main hub of tourists in the world, has made and other developmental projects such as Dubailand, more valuable, resulting in the property boom from 2004 to 2007. There are over 1,500 major freehold developments and communities in Dubai. Construction on a large scale is a part of Dubai Strategic Plan 2015 unveiled by Mohammed bin Rashid Al Maktoum, the Ruler of Dubai, to maintain economic growth and to put Dubai on the map of the world, and a tourist destination of the world. Construction on a large scale has turned Dubai into one of the fastest-growing cities in the world. There are a number of large-scale projects which are currently under construction or will be constructed in the future. Due to the heavy construction which is taking place in Dubai, 30,000 construction cranes, which is 25% of cranes worldwide, were operating in Dubai in 2012. Currently multibillion-dollar construction projects are taking shape in Dubai.

Global financial crisis of 2008–2009
However, due to the 2007–2008 financial crisis, several mega projects had been put on hold, including Palm Islands, Dubailand, the Arabian canal, Dubai Exhibition City, The Lagoons, Jumeirah Garden City. Apart from this many supertall skyscrapers have also been put on hold that includes Pentominium, Burj Al Alam, Marina 106, and Dubai Towers Dubai. Construction on Palm Jebel Ali and The World Islands were expected to be resumed in 2010, however recommencement has been further delayed. Construction on other halted projects was thought likely to be resumed in 2011.

Recovery from global financial crisis
A report published by Forbes on October 22, 2012, says Dubai has recovered faster from the financial crisis than most other countries and now its economy is growing in a higher rate than its counterparts because of its zero tax policy and economic free zones. The estimated GDP growth rate of Dubai in 2012 was 4.5%. The growth was mainly driven by the tourism, commerce and industrial manufacturing sectors.

According to the UAE's Ministry of Finance, Dubai's government has allocated 32.3 billion dirhams ($8.8 billion) for infrastructure projects in 2012, marking a return to big spending on such projects as some of these projects had been stalled due to lack of funding.

In November 2012, Sheikh Mohammed bin Rashid Al Maktoum announced fifteen new projects worth more than $187 million. These projects are a part of the municipality's 2013 to 2015 strategic plan of Dubai.

Mixed use developments

Other projects

[ Canada business tower in Dubai ]

Artificial reclaimed islands developments

Bridges

 Notes
 A. Construction is currently on hold due to lack of finances.
 B. Project is currently in planning stages.
 C. Only 22 out of 200 sub-projects of Dubailand are under construction.
 D. Approved; construction will start in April, 2013.

See also
 Dubai Real Estate Regulatory Agency
 List of buildings in Dubai
 List of hotels in Dubai
 List of shopping malls in Dubai
 Tourist attractions in Dubai

References

External links
 Mall of the World: World's First Temperature Controlled City - Dubai announced Mall of the World project on June 5, 2014.

Development projects
Lists of real estate in Dubai